Robert "Bob" Spears (8 August 1893 – 5 July 1950) was an Australian cyclist who was active on the track between 1913 and 1928. He was born in Dubbo, New South Wales and won his first race in the city at the age of fourteen. He won one gold and two silver medals in the sprint at the world championships of 1920–1922. He won six-day races in Melbourne (1913), Newark Velodrome (1915) and Chicago (1916), as well as Grand Prix of Paris (1920, 1921, 1922) and Grand Prix of Copenhagen (1922, 1925).

In 1985, he was inducted to the Sport Australia Hall of Fame.

References

1893 births
1950 deaths
Australian male cyclists
UCI Track Cycling World Champions (men)
Sport Australia Hall of Fame inductees
Australian track cyclists
People from Dubbo
Cyclists from New South Wales